Martha and the Vandellas Live! is a 1967 live album by Motown girl group Martha and the Vandellas, recorded live at Detroit's Twenty Grand Club, and released on the Gordy label. Among their legion of hits including "Heat Wave", "Jimmy Mack", "Nowhere to Run", "Love (Makes Me Do Foolish Things)" and "Dancing in the Street", the group also covered a bit of Aretha Franklin in the medley of "Do Right Woman, Do Right Man" and "Respect" and the Temptations' version of the standard "For Once in My Life".

Track listing

Personnel
Martha Reeves – lead vocals
Rosalind Ashford – background vocals
Betty Kelly – background vocals
Dave Van DePitte – arranger, conductor
Earl Van Dyke – keyboards

References

Martha and the Vandellas albums
1967 live albums
Gordy Records live albums
Motown live albums